Lawrence Trilling is a television director who has worked on many popular shows, including Alias, Felicity, Invasion, Monk, Pushing Daisies, Scrubs, Roswell, Goliath, and Parenthood.

In 2017, Trilling was announced as showrunner for Goliath.

Education 
Trilling graduated from Columbia University in 1988.

Directing credits
Condor
1.01 What Loneliness
Felicity
 1.15 The Fugue
 2.01 Sophomoric
 2.06 The Love Bug
 2.09 Portraits
 2.20 Ben Was Here
 3.04 Greeks and Geeks
 3.10 Let's Get It On
 3.12 Girlfight
 3.16 It's Raining Men
 4.03 Your Money or Your Wife
 4.09 Lonelyhearts
 4.11 A Perfect Match
 4.19 The Power of the Ex
 4.22 Back to the Future
Alias
 2.12 The Getaway
 2.20 Countdown
 3.04 A Missing Link
 3.06 The Nemesis
 3.11 Full Disclosure
 3.14 Blowback
 3.16 Taken
 3.21 Legacy
 4.03 The Awful Truth
 4.06 Nocturne
 4.10 The Index
 4.14 Nightingale
 4.17 A Clean Conscience
 4.21 Search and Rescue
 4.22 Before the Flood
Damages
 1.04 Tastes Like a Ho Ho
Roswell
 2.16 Heart of Mine
 3.14 Chant Down Babylon
Scrubs
 1.08 My Fifteen Minutes
 1.15 My Bed Banter and Beyond
 1.18 My Tuscaloosa Heart
 1.22 My Occurrence
 2.07 My First Step
 2.09 My Lucky Day
Parenthood
 1.02 Man Versus Possum
 1.03 The Deep End of the Pool
 1.08 Rubber Band Ball
 1.09 Perchance to Dream
 1.12 Team Braverman
 1.13 Lost and Found
 2.01 I Hear You, I See You
 2.02 No Good Deed
 2.11 Damage Control
 2.12 Meet the New Boss
 2.15 Just Go Home
 2.16 Amazing Andy and His Wonderful World of Bugs
 2.21 Slipping Away
 2.22 Hard Times Come Again No More
 3.01 I Don't Want to Do This Without You
 3.02 Hey, If You're Not Using That Baby...
 3.09 Sore Loser
 3.10 Mr. Honesty
 3.16 Tough Love
 3.18 My Brother's Wedding
 4.01 Family Portrait
 4.02 Left Field
 4.08 One More Weekend With You
 4.09 You Can't Always Get What You Want
 4.14 One Step Forward, Two Steps Back
 4.15 Because You're My Sister
 5.01 It Has to Be Now
 5.02 All Aboard Who's Coming Aboard
 5.08 The Ring
 5.09 Election Day
 5.17 Limbo
 5.18 The Offer
 5.22 The Pontiac
 6.01 Vegas
 6.02 Happy Birthday, Zeek
 6.08 Aaron Brownstein Must Be Stopped
 6.09 Lean In
 6.13 May God Bless and Keep You Always
Monk
2.05 Mr. Monk and the Very Very Old Man
Rogue
2.09 Citizen
Crazy Ex-Girlfriend
1.07 I'm So Happy that Josh is Happy!

References

External links

American film directors
American film producers
American male screenwriters
American television directors
American television producers
American television writers
Living people
Place of birth missing (living people)
Year of birth missing (living people)
American male television writers
Columbia College (New York) alumni